This article is the discography of English singer, songwriter and producer Jonathan King.

Albums

Studio albums

Compilation albums

Singles

1960s

1970s

1980s–present

As producer (selective)

Notes

References

Discographies of British artists
Pop music discographies
Rock music discographies